The year 648 BC was a year of the pre-Julian Roman calendar. In the Roman Empire, it was known as year 106 Ab urbe condita . The denomination 648 BC for this year has been used since the early medieval period, when the Anno Domini calendar era became the prevalent method in Europe for naming years.

Events

Middle East 

 Babylon falls to Assyrian forces after a 3-year siege (see 651 BC); starved out by his half brother Ashurbanipal, king Shamash-shum-ukin commits suicide in his burning palace, allegedly having built a pyre of his concubines and royal treasure as the Assyrians slaughter his city's garrison and much of its population.

Greece 

 Messenians in the Peloponnese revolt against Sparta under the leadership of king Aristomenes, beginning a struggle that will continue until 631 BC.
 April 6 - The earliest solar eclipse to be chronicled by the Greeks is observed.

Sports 

 Greece's 33rd games of the Olympiad is held at Olympia with a new event: the pankration is a no-holds-barred contest that combines boxing and wrestling.

Births 

 Josiah, king of Judah (d. 609 BC)

Deaths 

 Shamash-shum-ukin, Assyrian king of Babylonia

References